Eugeniusz Kubiak (born 25 May 1939) is a Polish rower. He competed in the men's single sculls event at the 1964 Summer Olympics.

References

1939 births
Living people
Polish male rowers
Olympic rowers of Poland
Rowers at the 1964 Summer Olympics
Sportspeople from Poznań